The Fugal Blacksmith Shop is a structure in Pleasant Grove, Utah, United States, that is listed on the National Register of Historic Places.

Description
The shop, located at approximately 680 North 400 East, was built in 1903. It served as the only blacksmith shop in Pleasant Grove during 1926-1962 after the other two converted into automobile garages.

The shop was listed on the National Register of Historic Places April 7, 1994.

See also

 National Register of Historic Places listings in Utah County, Utah
 Fugal Dugout House, also NRHP-listed in Pleasant Grove

References

External links

 

Blacksmith shops
Commercial buildings completed in 1903
Buildings and structures in Pleasant Grove, Utah
Commercial buildings on the National Register of Historic Places in Utah
Victorian architecture in Utah
Historic American Buildings Survey in Utah
National Register of Historic Places in Utah County, Utah